The government of Cristina Cifuentes was formed on 26 June 2015, following the latter's election as President of the Community of Madrid by the Assembly of Madrid on 24 June and her swearing-in on 25 June, as a result of the People's Party (PP) emerging as the largest parliamentary force at the 2015 Madrilenian regional election.

The cabinet comprised members of the PP and a number of independents. It was automatically dismissed on 28 April 2018 as a consequence of Cifuentes's resignation as president, but remained in acting capacity until the next government was sworn in.

Investiture

Cabinet changes
Cifuentes's government saw a number of cabinet changes during its tenure:

 On 23 September 2017, it was announced that the Environment, Local Administration and Territory Planning and Health ministers, Jaime González Taboada and Jesús Sánchez Martos respectively, would be removed from office, effective from 25 September, as a result of their involvement in a number of political controversies and corruption scandals. The move led to a larger reshuffle on 26 September which saw Pedro Rollán being appointed to fill the Environment, Local Administration and Territory Planning portfolio and replaced in his own Transport, Housing and Infrastructures ministry by Rosalía Gonzalo; Enrique Ruiz Escudero becoming new Minister of Health and a restructuring of two cabinet posts: the Education, Youth and Sports ministry became the Ministry of Education and Research, maintained by Rafael van Grieken; and the Culture, Tourism and Sports portfolio, whose attributions had been subsumed into the President's office in 2015, was re-established as an independent ministry under Jaime Miguel de los Santos.
 On 25 April 2018, Cifuentes resigned as regional president following a string of scandals starting in March, involving the fraudulent obtention of a master's degree, the subsequent document forgery to cover it up and the leaking of a 2011 shoplifting video in which she was involved. As a result, Minister of the Presidency Ángel Garrido served as acting president until being confirmed to the post on 19 May 2018.

Council of Government
The Council of Government was structured into the office for the president and seven ministries. From September 2017, the number of ministries was increased to eight.

Notes

References

2015 establishments in the Community of Madrid
2018 disestablishments in the Community of Madrid
Cabinets established in 2015
Cabinets disestablished in 2018
Cabinets of the Community of Madrid